The genus Argiope includes rather large spiders that often have a strikingly coloured abdomen.  These spiders are distributed throughout the world.  Most countries in tropical or temperate climates host one or more species that are similar in appearance.  The etymology of Argiope is from a Latin word argentum meaning silver. The carapace of Argiope species is typically covered in silvery hairs, and when crawling in the sun, they reflect it in a way that gives them a metallic, white appearance.

Description 
As most orb weavers, they own a third claw which is used to weave their complex webs. As most spiders, there is also a significant amount of sexual dimorphism, females measuring 19 to 28mm and males measuring 5 to 9mm. Their webs are relatively big, usually with zigzag patterns in them. They own black and yellow patterning all around their body, occasionally on their legs. Their legs mainly being black, with red or yellow patterning closer to the body. Their cephalothorax is covered with short silver hairs, and they own an egg shape abdomen.

Common names

Argiope bruennichi is commonly known as the wasp spider.  In Australia, Argiope keyserlingi and Argiope aetherea are known as St Andrew's cross spiders, for their habit of resting in the web with paired legs outstretched in the shape of an X and mirroring the large white web decoration (the cross of St. Andrew having the same form).  This white zigzag in the centre of its web is called the stabilimentum or web decoration.

In North America, Argiope aurantia is commonly known as the black and yellow garden spider, zipper spider, corn spider, or writing spider, because of the similarity of the web stabilimenta to writing.

The East Asian species Argiope amoena is known in Japan as kogane-gumo.  In the Philippines, they are known as gagambang ekis ("X spider"), and gagambang pari ("priest spider", due to the spider's body resembling a priest's head with a mitre).

Web
The average orb web is practically invisible, and it is easy to blunder into one and end up covered with a sticky web.  The visible pattern of banded silk made by Argiope is pure white, and some species make an "X" form, or a zigzag type of web (often with a hollow centre).  The spider then aligns one pair of its legs with each of the four lines in the hollow "X", making a complete "X" of white lines with a very eye-catching spider forming its centre.

The zigzag patterns, called stabilimenta, reflect UV light.  They have been shown to play a role in attracting prey to the web, and possibly in preventing its destruction by large animals.  The centres of their large webs are often just under 1 metre above the ground, so they are too low for anything much larger than a rabbit to walk under. The overtness of the spider and its web thus has been speculated to prevent larger creatures from accidentally destroying the web and possibly crushing the spider underfoot.

Other studies suggest that the stabilimenta may actually lead predators to the spider; species such as A. keyserlingi place their web predominantly in closed, complex habitats such as among sedges.

As Argiope sit in the centre of their web during the day, they have developed several responses to predators, such as dropping off the web, retreating to the periphery of the web, or even rapidly pumping the web in bursts of up to 30 seconds, similar to the motion done by the unrelated Pholcus phalangioides.

Reproduction

The male spider is much smaller than the female, and unassumingly marked.  When it is time to mate, the male spins a companion web alongside the female's.  After mating, the female lays her eggs, placing her egg sac into the web. The sac contains between 400 and 1400 eggs.

These eggs hatch in autumn, but the spiderlings overwinter in the sac and emerge during the spring.  The egg sac is composed of multiple layers of silk and protects its contents from damage; however, many species of insects have been observed to parasitise the egg sacs.

Bite
Like almost all other spiders, Argiope are harmless to humans.  As is the case with most garden spiders, they eat insects, and they are capable of consuming prey up to twice their size.  A. savigny was even reported to occasionally feed on the small bat Rhynchonycteris naso.

They can potentially bite if grabbed, but other than for defense, they do not attack large animals.  Their venom is not regarded as a serious medical problem for humans; it often contains a wide variety of polyamine toxins with potential as therapeutic medicinal agents. Notable among these is the argiotoxin ArgTX-636 (A. lobata).

A bite by the black and yellow garden spider (Argiope aurantia) is comparable to a bee sting, with redness and swelling.  For a healthy adult, a bite is not considered an issue.

Though they are not aggressive spiders, the very young, elderly, those with compromised immune systems, or those with known venom allergies should exercise caution, just as one would around a beehive.

Taxonomy
The first description of the genus Argiope is attributed to Jean Victoire Audouin in 1826, although he wrote that the genus was established by Savigny. In the first edition of the work in which the description appeared (Description de l'Égypte: Histoire Naturelle), Audouin used the spelling "Argyope", for both the French vernacular name and the Latin generic name. In the second edition, he continued to use "Argyope" for the French vernacular name, but the first mention of the Latin generic name had the spelling "Argiope", although the binomial names of the species continued to use "Argyope". This led to controversy as to whether Audouin had intended to correct the spelling of the generic name, which is derived from the Greek αργιόπη. In 1975, the International Commission on Zoological Nomenclature validated the spelling "Argiope", on the basis that the change from the first to the second edition was an intended correction.

Species
, Argiope contains 88 species:

A. abramovi Logunov & Jäger, 2015 – Vietnam
A. aemula (Walckenaer, 1841) – India to Philippines, Indonesia (Sulawesi), Vanuatu
A. aetherea (Walckenaer, 1841) – China to Australia
A. aetheroides Yin, Wang, Zhang, Peng & Chen, 1989 – China, Japan
A. ahngeri Spassky, 1932 – Iran, Kyrgyzstan, Turkmenistan, Uzbekistan, Tajikistan?
A. amoena L. Koch, 1878 – China, Korea, Taiwan, Japan
A. anasuja Thorell, 1887 – Seychelles to India, Pakistan, Maldives
A. anomalopalpis Bjørn, 1997 – Congo, South Africa
A. appensa (Walckenaer, 1841) – Hawaii, Taiwan to New Guinea
A. argentata (Fabricius, 1775) – USA to Chile, Argentina
A. aurantia Lucas, 1833 – Canada to Costa Rica
A. aurocincta Pocock, 1898 – Central, East, Southern Africa
A. australis (Walckenaer, 1805) – Central, East, Southern Africa, Cape Verde Is.
A. bivittigera Strand, 1911 – Indonesia
A. blanda O. Pickard-Cambridge, 1898 – USA to Costa Rica
A. boesenbergi Levi, 1983 – China, Korea, Japan
A. bougainvilla (Walckenaer, 1847) – New Guinea to Solomon Is.
A. bruennichi (Scopoli, 1772) – Europe, Turkey, Israel, Russia (Europe to Far East), Iran, Central Asia to China, Korea, Japan
A. brunnescentia Strand, 1911 – New Guinea, Papua New Guinea (Bismarck Arch.)
A. buehleri Schenkel, 1944 – Timor
A. bullocki Rainbow, 1908 – Australia (New South Wales)
A. butchko LeQuier & Agnarsson, 2016 – Cuba
A. caesarea Thorell, 1897 – India, Myanmar, China
A. caledonia Levi, 1983 – New Caledonia, Vanuatu
A. cameloides Zhu & Song, 1994 – China
A. carvalhoi (Mello-Leitão, 1944) – Brazil
A. catenulata (Doleschall, 1859) – India to Philippines, New Guinea, Australia
A. chloreis Thorell, 1877 – Laos, Indonesia, Papua New Guinea
A. comorica Bjørn, 1997 – Comoros, Mayotte
A. coquereli (Vinson, 1863) – Tanzania (Zanzibar), Madagascar
A. dang Jäger & Praxaysombath, 2009 – Thailand, Laos
A. dietrichae Levi, 1983 – Australia (Western Australia, Northern Australia)
A. doboensis Strand, 1911 – Indonesia, New Guinea
A. doleschalli Thorell, 1873 – Indonesia
A. ericae Levi, 2004 – Brazil, Argentina
A. flavipalpis (Lucas, 1858) – Africa, Yemen
A. florida Chamberlin & Ivie, 1944 – USA
A. halmaherensis Strand, 1907 – Indonesia (Moluccas) to New Guinea
A. hinderlichi Jäger, 2012 – Laos
A. hoiseni Tan, 2018 – Malaysia (Peninsula)
A. intricata Simon, 1877 – Philippines
A. jinghongensis Yin, Peng & Wang, 1994 – China, Vietnam, Laos, Thailand
A. kaingang Corronca & Rodríguez-Artigas, 2015 – Argentina
A. katherina Levi, 1983 – Northern Australia
A. keyserlingi Karsch, 1878 – Australia (Queensland, New South Wales, Lord Howe Is.)
A. kochi Levi, 1983 – Australia (Queensland)
A. legionis Motta & Levi, 2009 – Brazil
A. levii Bjørn, 1997 – South Africa, Kenya, Tanzania
A. lobata (Pallas, 1772) – Southern Europe to Central Asia and China, northern Africa, South Africa, Israel, India, from Myanmar to New Caledonia and northern Australia
A. luzona (Walckenaer, 1841) – Philippines
A. macrochoera Thorell, 1891 – India (Nicobar Is.), China
A. madang Levi, 1984 – New Guinea
A. magnifica L. Koch, 1871 – Australia (Queensland) to Solomon Is.
A. mangal Koh, 1991 – Singapore
A. manila Levi, 1983 – Philippines
A. mascordi Levi, 1983 – Australia (Queensland)
A. minuta Karsch, 1879 – Bangladesh, East Asia
A. modesta Thorell, 1881 – Borneo to Australia
A. niasensis Strand, 1907 – Indonesia
A. ocula Fox, 1938 – China, Taiwan, Japan
A. ocyaloides L. Koch, 1871 – Australia (Queensland)
A. pentagona L. Koch, 1871 – Fiji
A. perforata Schenkel, 1963 – China
A. picta L. Koch, 1871 – Indonesia (Moluccas) to Australia
A. pictula Strand, 1911 – Indonesia (Sulawesi)
A. ponape Levi, 1983 – Caroline Is.
A. possoica Merian, 1911 – Indonesia (Sulawesi)
A. probata Rainbow, 1916 – Australia (Queensland)
A. protensa L. Koch, 1872 – New Guinea, Australia, New Caledonia, New Zealand
A. pulchella Thorell, 1881 – India to China and Indonesia
A. pulchelloides Yin, Wang, Zhang, Peng & Chen, 1989 – China
A. radon Levi, 1983 – Northern Australia
A. ranomafanensis Bjørn, 1997 – Madagascar
A. reinwardti (Doleschall, 1859) – Malaysia to New Guinea
Argiope r. sumatrana (Hasselt, 1882) – Indonesia (Sumatra)
A. sapoa Barrion & Litsinger, 1995 – Philippines
A. sector (Forsskål, 1776) – North Africa, Middle East, Cape Verde Is.
A. squallica Strand, 1915 – New Guinea
A. submaronica Strand, 1916 – Mexico to Bolivia, Brazil
A. takum Chrysanthus, 1971 – New Guinea
A. tapinolobata Bjørn, 1997 – Senegal, Namibia
A. taprobanica Thorell, 1887 – Sri Lanka
A. trifasciata (Forsskål, 1775) – North, Central and South America. Introduced to Africa, Portugal to Israel, Iran, China, Japan, Australia (Tasmania), Pacific Is.
Argiope t. deserticola Simon, 1906 – Sudan
Argiope t. kauaiensis Simon, 1900 – Hawaii
A. truk Levi, 1983 – Caroline Is.
A. versicolor (Doleschall, 1859) – China to Indonesia (Java)
A. vietnamensis Ono, 2010 – Vietnam

Injury and pain
Argiope use autotomy - restricting blood flow to their own leg until it falls off - to minimize blood loss due to injury. This is triggered by pain. Honeybee and wasp venoms induce the same pain in Argiope - even when the injury is minor - causing Argiope to drop the affected leg. The same effect can also be produced by chemically fractionated components of those venoms (specifically serotonin, histamine, and phospholipase A2) that also cause pain in humans.

Footnotes

References
  (The actual date of publication to be used in zoological nomenclature is explained in )
 
  (Argiope argentata)

External links

 Pictures of Argiope species — Forestry Images, University of Georgia (free for noncommercial use)
St. Andrews Cross Spider Argiope keyserlingii —  Museum Victoria

 
Araneomorphae genera
Cosmopolitan spiders